Nova Jugoslavija Square is a municipal square in Kumanovo, North Macedonia.

Construction
The square was reconstructed in 2006 for an estimated cost of 160,000 euros.

Notable landmarks
Zanatski Dom is one of the buildings on the square that was built before the Second World War. 
Recently there have been erected two monuments on the square
Batko Gjorgjija Monument
Chetiri Bandere Monumemt 
Gradski Ploshtad is surrounded by buildings built mostly from the SFRY time. First floors of some of them were adopted in to very lucrative real-estates. The following companies found their place.

T-Mobile shop
One Shop
Tinex Market
Nama Café
Mister George Café 
Club Night Club
Office Plus shop
K-Net Shop
Tehnomarket Shop
Komerdijalna Banka A.D. Skopje Shop
Demetra Shop

There are no operating hotels close to the square. In the 1990s the hotel Kristal was closed due to financial difficulties. The Kasapski Krug building is just across Goce Delchev street as one of the landmark buildings of Kumanovo.

List of events

Gallery

References

Squares in Kumanovo